Alansar Mosque is a mosque in Sana'a, Yemen. It lies to the southwest of Albolaily Mosque, and Sana'a Fish Market.

See also
 Islam in Yemen

References

Mosques in Sanaa